Sakyi is a surname. Notable people with the surname include:

Moses Sakyi (born 1981), Ghanaian footballer
Kwaku Sakyi-Addo, Ghanaian journalist

Ghanaian surnames